Baima Township is a township of Huachi County in eastern Gansu province, China, located about  northwest of the county seat as the crow flies. , it administers Baima Forestry Residential Neighborhood and the following six villages:
Baima Village
Lianji Village
Wanggoumen Village
Magaozhuang Village
Dongzhang Village
Duzhaizi Village

See also 
 List of township-level divisions of Gansu

References 

Township-level divisions of Gansu
Huachi County